Myra is a genus of crabs in the family Leucosiidae.

SpeciesCrab Database
Myra affinis
Myra australis
Myra biconica
Myra brevimana
Myra celeris
Myra currax
Myra curtimana
Myra digitata
Myra elegans
Myra eudactylus
Myra fugax
Myra grandis
Myra hainanica
Myra intermedia
Myra mammilaris
Myra pernix
Myra subgranulata
Myra tumidospina

References

Crabs